The 1976 Masters Tournament was the 40th Masters Tournament, held April 8–11 at Augusta National Golf Club in Augusta, Georgia.

Raymond Floyd won his only Masters title, eight strokes ahead of runner-up Ben Crenshaw. He shot a 131 (−13) over the first two rounds, then posted two rounds of 70 on the weekend to tie Jack Nicklaus' record  of 271 (−17), set in 1965. In the first three rounds, Floyd was under-par on every par-5, with eleven birdies and an eagle, and his 54-hole total of 201 (−15) was the lowest ever. Defending champion Nicklaus was the nearest pursuer, eight shots back at 209. It was the second of Floyd's four major titles. Tiger Woods broke the 72-hole record by a stroke 21 years later in 1997 with 270 (−18), which was  tied by Jordan Spieth in 2015.

Beginning with this Masters, a sudden-death playoff format was introduced, and originally planned to start at the first hole. After three years without use, it was changed to begin on the 10th hole in 1979; used for the first time that year, it ended on the eleventh green. In 2004, the playoff was changed to start on the 18th hole and then alternate with the adjacent 10th hole. Prior to 1976, playoffs were full 18-hole rounds on Monday, and the last was won by Billy Casper in 1970. The first playoff in 1935 was the exception at 36 holes.

Floyd was the fourth wire-to-wire winner in Masters history, following Craig Wood  in 1941, Arnold Palmer in 1960, and Nicklaus in 1972.  The next was  Jordan Spieth, 39 years later, in 2015.

Field
1. Masters champions
Tommy Aaron, George Archer, Gay Brewer, Billy Casper (8,10,11,12), Charles Coody, Doug Ford, Bob Goalby, Jack Nicklaus (2,4,8,9,10,11,12), Arnold Palmer (8,9), Gary Player (3,4), Sam Snead, Art Wall Jr. (8,11)
Jack Burke Jr., Jimmy Demaret, Ralph Guldahl, Claude Harmon, Ben Hogan, Herman Keiser, Cary Middlecoff, Byron Nelson, Henry Picard, and Gene Sarazen did not play.

The following categories only apply to Americans

2. U.S. Open champions (last five years)
Lou Graham (9,12), Hale Irwin (8,9,10,11,12), Johnny Miller (8,11,12), Lee Trevino (3,4,8,12)

3. The Open champions (last five years)
Tom Watson (8,9,11), Tom Weiskopf (8,10,11,12)

4. PGA champions (last five years)

5. 1975 U.S. Amateur semi-finalists
Henri DeLozier (a), Keith Fergus (a), Fred Ridley (6,a)

Andy Bean forfeited his exemption by turning professional.

6. Previous two U.S. Amateur and Amateur champions
Vinny Giles (7,a)

Jerry Pate (7) forfeited his exemption by turning professional.

7. Members of the 1975 U.S. Walker Cup team
William C. Campbell (a), John Grace (a), Jay Haas (a), Dick Siderowf (a), Curtis Strange (a)

George Burns, Gary Koch, and Craig Stadler forfeited their exemptions by turning professional.

8. Top 24 players and ties from the 1975 Masters Tournament
Buddy Allin, Rod Curl, Pat Fitzsimons (9), Hubert Green (11), Dave Hill (10,11), Ralph Johnston, Tom Kite, Gene Littler (10,11,12), Allen Miller, Bobby Nichols, J. C. Snead (11,12), Larry Ziegler

9. Top 16 players and ties from the 1975 U.S. Open
Frank Beard, Ben Crenshaw (11), Joe Inman, John Mahaffey, Rik Massengale (11), Bob Murphy (12), Eddie Pearce, Jim Wiechers

10. Top eight players and ties from 1975 PGA Championship
Andy North

11. Winners of PGA Tour events since the previous Masters
Don Bies, Jim Colbert, Raymond Floyd (12), Al Geiberger (12), Bob Gilder, Don Iverson, Don January, Tom Jenkins, Roger Maltbie, Jerry McGee, Dean Refram

12. Members of the U.S. 1975 Ryder Cup team

13. Foreign invitations
Hugh Baiocchi (8), Maurice Bembridge, Bobby Cole (8), Bruce Crampton (10,11), Bruce Devlin (8), Priscillo Diniz (a), Dale Hayes, Graham Marsh (8), Takashi Murakami, Jack Newton, Peter Oosterhuis (9), Masashi Ozaki, Bob Shearer

Numbers in brackets indicate categories that the player would have qualified under had they been American.

Round summaries

First round
Thursday, April 8, 1976

Source:

Second round
Friday, April 9, 1976

Source:

Third round
Saturday, April 10, 1976

Source:

Final round
Sunday, April 11, 1976

Final leaderboard

Sources:

Scorecard

Cumulative tournament scores, relative to par

References

External links
Masters.com – past winners and results
Augusta.com – 1976 Masters leaderboard and scorecards

1976
1976 in golf
1976 in American sports
1976 in sports in Georgia (U.S. state)
April 1976 sports events in the United States